The Hill & Stanier was an English automobile, a six-horsepower cyclecar with a V twin, air-cooled engine. Drive was to the rear wheels by belt to a countershaft and then by chain to the wheels.

It was manufactured by R Hill, Stanier and Company in Newcastle-upon-Tyne only in 1914.

See also
 List of car manufacturers of the United Kingdom

References

Cyclecars
Defunct motor vehicle manufacturers of England
Companies based in Newcastle upon Tyne